Michael Catalano (born September 11, 1995) is an American soccer player.

Career

Youth and college 
Catalano played four years of college soccer at the University of Wisconsin between 2014 and 2017, where he made 67 appearances, scoring 19 goals and tallying 5 assists.

Catalano also played with Premier Development League sides Reading United and Chicago FC United during his college years.

Professional 
On January 21, 2018, Catalano was selected 54th overall in the 2018 MLS SuperDraft by Philadelphia Union. He signed with the Union's United Soccer League affiliate side Bethlehem Steel on March 1, 2018.

Bethlehem Steel released Catalano at the end of the 2018 season.

References

External links 
 
 Bethlehem Steel FC player profile

1995 births
Living people
People from Roselle, Illinois
American soccer players
Wisconsin Badgers men's soccer players
Reading United A.C. players
Chicago FC United players
Philadelphia Union II players
Association football midfielders
Soccer players from Illinois
Sportspeople from DuPage County, Illinois
USL League Two players
Philadelphia Union draft picks